Anwarul Abedin Khan (আনোয়ারুল আবেদীন খান) is a Bangladesh Awami League politician and the incumbent Member of Parliament from Mymensingh-9.

Career
Khan was elected to Parliament in 2014 from Mymensingh-9 as a candidate of Bangladesh Awami League. On 28 November 2015, a curfew was imposed on his locality following fights between his supporters and those of former member of parliament, Major General (retired) Abdus Salam. He is one of the member of the Standing Committee on Ministry of Agriculture.

References

Awami League politicians
Living people
10th Jatiya Sangsad members
11th Jatiya Sangsad members
Year of birth missing (living people)